Miroslav Vujasinović is a Dominican handball coach of the Dominican national team.

References

Living people
Dominican Republic handball coaches
Year of birth missing (living people)